William Brill may refer to:
 William H. Brill (1871–1923), American journalist
 William Brill (RAAF officer) (1916–1964), Australian military pilot
 Bill Brill (1931–2011), American sportswriter